Víctor Manuel Caratini (born August 17, 1993) is a Puerto Rican professional baseball catcher for the Milwaukee Brewers of Major League Baseball (MLB). He previously played for the Chicago Cubs and San Diego Padres. After catching Joe Musgrove’s no-hitter, he was given the nickname “The Scientist”.

Career

Atlanta Braves
Caratini was drafted by the Atlanta Braves in the second round of the 2013 Major League Baseball draft out of Miami Dade College. He made his professional debut that season with the Danville Braves. After primarily playing third base his first season, Caratini played mostly as a catcher in 2014. He started the season with the Rome Braves.

Chicago Cubs
On July 31, the Braves traded Caratini to the Chicago Cubs for Emilio Bonifacio and James Russell. The Cubs sent him to the Kane County Cougars, where he finished the season. Caratini spent the 2015 season with the Myrtle Beach Pelicans where he batted .257, with four home runs and 53 runs batted in. He spent the 2016 season with the Tennessee Smokies, where be batted .291 with six home runs and 47 runs batted in. After the 2016 season, Caratini played for the Mesa Solar Sox of the Arizona Fall League and was added to the Cubs 40-man roster.

Caratini began the 2017 season with the Iowa Cubs of the Class AAA Pacific Coast League. The Cubs promoted Caratini to the major leagues on June 28, 2017. He appeared in 31 games with the 2017 Cubs, batting .254 with one home run and two runs batted in. In 2018, Caratini played in 76 MLB games, batting .232 with two home runs and 21 runs batted in. He made two pitching appearances during the season, both in late July, pitching a total of two innings while allowing two runs for a 9.00 earned run average. He also played in the 2018 National League Wild Card Game, grounding out as a pinch hitter, as the Cubs fell to the Colorado Rockies, 2–1 in 13 innings.

Caratini began the 2019 season as one of the Cubs' two catchers, along with Willson Contreras. Caratini made another pitching appearance on June 22, pitching a scoreless ninth inning in a Cubs loss to the New York Mets. On the year, Caratini slashed .266/.348/.447 with career-highs in home runs (11) and runs batted in (34) in 95 games for the Cubs.

On September 13, 2020, Caratini caught a no-hitter against the Milwaukee Brewers for teammate Alec Mills. In the pandemic-shortened 2020 season, Caratini batted .241/.333/.328 in 44 games for Chicago, with one home run and 16 runs batted in over 132 plate appearances.

San Diego Padres
On December 29, 2020, Caratini and Yu Darvish were traded to the San Diego Padres in exchange for pitcher Zach Davies, Reginald Preciado, Yeison Santana, Ismael Mena, and Owen Caissie. 

On April 9, 2021, Caratini caught a no-hitter against the Texas Rangers for teammate Joe Musgrove, the first no-hitter in Padres history and the second no-hitter he had caught in eight months. There had not been a no-hitter in MLB since Caratini had caught one with the Cubs, which made Caratini the first catcher in MLB history to catch consecutive no-hitters for two different teams. On June 17, 2021, Caratini hit his first career walk-off home run against pitcher Amir Garrett and the Cincinnati Reds. In 2021, Caratini played in a career-high 116 games and batted .227/.309/.323 with 7 home runs and 39 RBIs.

On March 22, 2022, Caratini signed a $2 million contract with the Padres, avoiding salary arbitration.

Milwaukee Brewers
On April 6, 2022, Caratini was traded to the Milwaukee Brewers in exchange for Brett Sullivan and Korry Howell. On July 4, 2022, Caratini hit his second career walk-off home run against Scott Effross and his old team, the Chicago Cubs. Caratini became the fifth player in major league history to strike out four times before hitting a walk-off home run. In 95 games with Milwaukee in 2022, he batted .199/.300/.342 with 9 home runs and 34 RBIs.

On January 12, 2023, Caratini agreed to a one-year, $2.8 million contract with the Brewers, avoiding salary arbitration.

See also
 List of Major League Baseball players from Puerto Rico

References

External links

1993 births
Living people
People from Coamo, Puerto Rico
Major League Baseball players from Puerto Rico
Major League Baseball catchers
Chicago Cubs players
San Diego Padres players
Milwaukee Brewers players
Miami Dade Sharks baseball players
Danville Braves players
Rome Braves players
Leones de Ponce players
Kane County Cougars players
South Bend Cubs players
Myrtle Beach Pelicans players
Tennessee Smokies players
Mesa Solar Sox players
Iowa Cubs players
Criollos de Caguas players
Liga de Béisbol Profesional Roberto Clemente catchers